Holy Cross Church in Ligota Górna, Poland, is a wooden church built in 1787. The church, a chapel of ease serves the Roman Catholic and the Evangelical-Augsburg Church.

References

Kluczbork County
Ligota Górna